The women's 5000 metres event at the 2018 African Championships in Athletics was held on 2 August in Asaba, Nigeria.

Results

References

2018 African Championships in Athletics
5000 metres at the African Championships in Athletics